Edward Habane (born 1957) is a South African cricketer. He played in one first-class match in 1975. In that match, along with Sedick Conrad, Habane was one of the first black African players to play in a mixed first-class side against a touring team since the 1920s.

See also
 International cricket in South Africa from 1971 to 1981

References

External links
 

1957 births
Living people
South African cricketers
Place of birth missing (living people)